Chanteheux is a commune in the Meurthe-et-Moselle department in north-eastern France.

Geography 
Chanteheux is located in the north-east of Lunéville. The commune is crossed by the Vezouze.

Economy 
Chanteheux has a bakery, a bar and a hairdressing salon in its center, and commercial zone in its periphery.

Community and sports life 
Chanteheux has an amateur football club, the Amicale de Chanteheux.

The family association organize every year wine fair of Lunéville, a wood fair, and Christmas market, usually taking place at the local multifunctional room.

Spots and monuments 
 St Barthélemy Church
 War memorial
 Castle built in 1740 for the last duke of Lorraine Stanislaw Leszczynski, destructed just after his death.

See also
Communes of the Meurthe-et-Moselle department

References

Communes of Meurthe-et-Moselle